Buffy Dee, born Anthony DeSantolo (1923–1995), was an Italian-American actor and musician. Buffy Dee suffered from Polio as a child and spent a short portion of his life in wheelchair. Although he recovered, he was left with a slight limp. He went to school for law and finished his degree at the University of Miami. He married Eleanor Korn. He did not have any children. Buffy Dee was a drummer for Carmen Cavallaro.

Filmography

References

External links 
 

1923 births
1995 deaths
American male television actors
People with polio
University of Miami alumni
Italian emigrants to the United States
20th-century American male actors
20th-century American drummers
American male drummers
20th-century American male musicians